Mike Trésor Ndayishimiye (born 28 May 1999) is a Belgian professional footballer who plays for Belgian club Genk.

Club career
He made his Eerste Divisie debut for NEC on 21 September 2018 in a game against Helmond Sport, as a 78th-minute substitute for Jonathan Okita.

On 2 September 2019, he joined Willem II in the top-tier Eredivisie on loan for the 2019–20 season. On 30 October, Ndayishimiye scored a hat-trick in a 4–0 win against Quick in the first round of the KNVB Cup.

Personal life
He is a son of Burundian former international footballer, Freddy Ndayishimiye.

References

External links
 
 

1999 births
People from Halle, Belgium
Living people
Belgian footballers
Belgium under-21 international footballers
Belgium youth international footballers
Association football forwards
NEC Nijmegen players
Willem II (football club) players
K.R.C. Genk players
Eerste Divisie players
Eredivisie players
Belgian Pro League players
Belgian expatriate footballers
Expatriate footballers in the Netherlands
Belgian people of Burundian descent
Footballers from Flemish Brabant